The California quail (Callipepla californica), also known as the California valley quail or Valley quail, is a small ground-dwelling bird in the New World quail family. These birds have a curving crest or plume, made of six feathers, that droops forward: black in males and brown in females; the flanks are brown with white streaks. Males have a dark brown cap and a black face with a brown back, a grey-blue chest and a light brown belly. Females and immature birds are mainly grey-brown with a light-colored belly.
The two species separated about 1–2 million years ago, during the Late Pliocene or Early Pleistocene. It was selected as the state bird of California in 1931.

Taxonomy

Subspecies
There are seven recognized subspecies:
 C. c. achrustera (Peters, 1923) – San Lucas California quail – southern Baja California 
 C. c. brunnescens (Ridgway, 1884) – extreme northern coastal California to southern Santa Cruz County
 C. c. californica (Shaw, 1798) – northern Oregon and western Nevada to southern California and Coronado Islands
 C. c. canfieldae (Van Rossem, 1939) – Owen Valley quail – Owens Valley of east central California
 C. c. catalinensis (Grinnell, 1906) – Santa Catalina quail – Santa Catalina Island (off southern California)
 C. c. orecta (Oberholser, 1932) – Warner Valley quail – Warner Valley in Oregon to extreme northern California
 C. c. plumbea (Grinnell, 1926) – San Quintin California quail – San Diego County to southern Baja California

Behavior
The California quail is a highly sociable bird that often gathers in small flocks known as "coveys". One of their daily communal activities is a dust bath. A group of quail will select an area where the ground has been newly turned or is soft, and using their underbellies, will burrow downward into the soil some one to two inches. They then wriggle about in the indentations they have created, flapping their wings and ruffling their feathers, causing dust to rise in the air. They seem to prefer sunny places in which to create these dust baths.

They are year-round residents. Although this bird coexists well at the edges of urban areas, it is declining in some areas as human populations increase. They were originally found mainly in the southwestern United States but they have been introduced into other areas including British Columbia, Hawaii, Chile, Uruguay, Brazil, Argentina, Peru, South Africa, New Zealand, and to Norfolk Island and King Island in Australia.
These birds forage on the ground, often scratching at the soil. They can sometimes be seen feeding at the sides of roads. Their diet consists mainly of seeds and leaves, but they also eat some berries and insects; for example, Toyon berries are a common food source. If startled, these birds explode into short rapid flight, called "flushing". Given a choice, they will normally escape on foot.

Breeding

Their breeding habitat is shrubby areas and open woodlands in western North America. The nest is a shallow scrape lined with vegetation on the ground beneath a shrub or other cover. The female usually lays approximately 12 eggs. Once hatched, the young associate with both adults. Often, families group together, into multifamily "communal broods" which include at least two females, multiple males and many offspring. Males associated with families are not always the genetic fathers. In good years, females will lay more than one clutch, leaving the hatched young with the associated male and laying a new clutch, often with a different associated male.

They have a variety of vocalizations including the social "chicago" call, contact "pips" and warning "pips". During the breeding season, males utter the agonistic "squill" and will often interrupt their social mate's "chicago" call with a "squill," a possible form of antiphonal calling.

State bird
The California quail is the state bird of California. It was established as the state bird in 1932.

The quail population has fluctuated significantly throughout California. Once plentiful in San Francisco, by 2017 only one California quail remained in the city. Local birders named the male bird Ishi after the last known member of California's Native American Yahi tribe. Quail were likely introduced to Santa Catalina Island, in Los Angeles county about 12,000 years ago by Native Americans, and there is a minimal genetic difference between the island and mainland quail populations.

Gallery

References

Further reading

External links 

 
 California Quail conservation at Quail Unlimited
 

California quail
California quail
Native birds of Western Canada
Native birds of the Western United States
Fauna of the California chaparral and woodlands
Fauna of the Mojave Desert
Fauna of the Colorado Desert
Birds of Mexico
Game birds
Symbols of California
Fauna of the San Francisco Bay Area
California quail
California quail
California quail